Player names marked in bold went on to earn full international caps.

Group A

Bahrain
Head coach:Abdulaziz Abdo Omar

Thailand
Head coach: Anurak Srikerd

South Korea
Head coach:An Ik-soo

|-----
! colspan="9" bgcolor="#B0D3FB" align="left" |
|-----

|-----
! colspan="9" bgcolor="#B0D3FB" align="left" |
|-----

|-----
! colspan="9" bgcolor="#B0D3FB" align="left" |
|-----

Saudi Arabia
Head coach: Saad Al-Shehri

Group B

North Korea
Head coach:Ri song ho

United Arab Emirates
Head Coach:Jakub Dovalil

Iraq
Head coach: Abbas Attiya

Vietnam
Head coach: Hoàng Anh Tuấn

Group C

Qatar

Head coach:Oscar Moreno

Japan
Head coach:Atsushi Uchiyama

Yemen

Head coach:Mohammed AL-Nufiay

Iran
Head coach: Amir Hossein Peiravani

Group D

Uzbekistan
Head coach: Jasur Abduraimov

China
Head coach: Li Ming

Australia
Head coach:Ufuk Talay

Tajikistan
Head coach:Vitaliy Levchenko

References

, the-AFC.com

External links

Squads
AFC U-19 Championship squads